"The Blacker the Berry" is a song by American hip hop recording artist Kendrick Lamar. It was included as the thirteenth song on the track-listing of his third studio album To Pimp a Butterfly (2015). "The Blacker the Berry" was released as the second single from the album on February 9, 2015. The song shares its title with the novel The Blacker the Berry by American author Wallace Thurman. The track produced by Boi-1da, Terrace Martin, and KOZ. It has a chorus that features Jamaican artist Assassin. The album version also contains additional vocals provided by neo soul singer Lalah Hathaway. Upon its release, "The Blacker the Berry'" received rave reviews from contemporary music critics. However, its also elicited controversy due to Kendrick Lamar's commentary on the death of Trayvon Martin. In the United States, it peaked at number sixty-six on the U.S. Billboard Hot 100 chart. The single has since been certified Gold by the Recording Industry Association of America (RIAA).

Background
Being Kendrick Lamar's first major statement since "i", a single released in late 2014, "The Blacker the Berry" is a departure from its "self-love-promoting" predecessor. Whereas "i" was sweet and naïve, "The Blacker the Berry" is discordant and fierce, being a racially-charged song. American record producer and multi-instrumentalist Terrace Martin worked with several musicians, including Robert Glasper, Lalah Hathaway, Thundercat, Anna Wise to compose the politically charged number. The track features a "boom-bap beat", with lyrics that celebrate his African-American heritage, and "tackles hatred, racism, and hypocrisy head on." Its lyrics have Lamar castigating himself for being no better than the police. The song's chorus is performed by Jamaican dancehall artist Assassin, notable for performing on Kanye West's 2013 LP Yeezus. 

"The Blacker the Berry" is thought to be a response from Kendrick Lamar to criticism he received for comments made regarding the shooting of Michael Brown and the subsequent Ferguson unrest. Its sentiments echo statements Lamar made regarding the death of Michael Brown. In a Billboard interview, when asked if he ever had been mistreated in encounters with police, Lamar replied, "plenty of times. All the time." But when questioned about the highly publicized killings of African-Americans by police officers in 2014, Lamar stated, "What happened to [Michael Brown] should've never happened. Never. But when we don't have respect for ourselves, how do we expect them to respect us? It starts from within. Don't start with just a rally, don't start from looting -- it starts from within." His comments sparked a backlash from audiences, journalists and fellow rappers, including Azealia Banks who called it "the dumbest shit I've ever heard a black man say."

The release of "The Blacker the Berry" came after Darryl McDaniels of the influential rap group Run-DMC claimed that radios were "too afraid" to play Kendrick Lamar because he speaks the truth. In an interview with The Independent, he stated, "I don't believe in conspiracy theories but people are scared of a young man that looks like that from their neighborhood talking about real issues." Sharing similar sentiment, producer Terrance Martin remarked, "That line speaks personally to me. When you grow up in L.A. (or anywhere but I'm specifically talking about where I grew up), you can be pro-black, pro-self-love and say, "I'm on this march and love thy brother and no black-on-black," but you go to the gas station, somebody rolls up next to you and you sense danger." He continued saying, "The more we trip over other 'hoods and kill each other, it puts another dark thing [under] your belt. That spoke to me because I've been in those situations where I'm talking this love shit, this jazz shit, but another dude doesn't wanna hear that and there's an issue. Sometimes talking about love doesn't work all the time."

Artwork lawsuit
On July 10, 2015, a lawsuit was filed by photographer Giordano Cipriani, stating that Lamar and the song's associated record labels (Top Dawg, Aftermath, Interscope) used a photo of his without permission or payment. The photo in question features a mother breastfeeding two children. Cipriani states that he had taken the photo in 2011 while he was in Africa. He is also demanding $150,000 for each time the photo was used.

Recording
The track was produced by American record producer, multi-instrumentalist and rapper Terrace Martin. He played a key role in strengthening the brand of his cousin Snoop Dogg after graduating from high school. Martin has been behind studio album released in 2014 by artists such as Big K.R.I.T. and YG in addition to his own record, 3ChordFold (2013). During an interview with Billboard, Martin spoke about the making of "The Blacker the Berry," describing his experience working with Kendrick Lamar and the message they sought to deliver on with the song. The lyrics of its verses were finished when Lamar approached Martin but the singing had yet to be laid over the track. Its hip hop beat was constructed from hard-hitting drums by Boi-1da. Meanwhile, Martin integrated the jazz arrangements which arrive at the song's conclusion, taking cues from Lalah Hathaway and James Fauntleroy.

Martin incorporated a jazz section for the ending of the record to give the intense feeling left by its third verse some sense of resolution. He worked with Glasper on a Fender Rhodes in addition to Fauntleroy, Hathaway, Thundercat on bass to compose the arrangement. Martin had listened to and meditated on the record and came to believe that Lamar was discussing issues that were perfectly time for what was going on in life. He stated, "It's a soulful record, it's a record that needed to be done, and it's like the modern times of Public Enemy. It's a black record. It's a record about being black and being proud at the end of the day. It inspired me to counteract what he was doing with something hella jazzy. He just got done talking about 'hypocrites' and pro-black shit, and I'm like, "Let me calm that down because we [are about to] cause a riot out here!"

Composition

"The Blacker the Berry" is a politically charged hip hop song that lasts for a duration of five minutes and twenty-eight seconds. Along with amorphous song structures, its musical composition is marked by cinematic production. The track is built on a boom bap beat while providing subversive musical styles reminiscent of Parliament-Funkadelic. The song's lyrical content retains intense social commentary. Lamar surveys the world around him in a foreboding manner. His urgent rapping demonstrates discipline and control, even as an irregular cadence hits and runs over beat. Each of his straightforward lines comes at a direct and cutting pace, with Lamar abandoning his habitual tendency to fill up lines with melodious syllables.

The song opens with a dark, bleary loop and wistful recitation of the words, "blacker the berry, sweeter the juice." Lamar begins his verse by declaring himself "the biggest hypocrite in 2015" atop the bombastic beat. Following the opening lines, he prophesies, "Once I finish this witnesses will convey just what I mean." Throughout the number, Lamar celebrates his African-American heritage while bluntly tackling hatred and racism. During the first two verses, Lamar strike at racism and stereotypes blacks face in America, all while continuously labeling himself "the biggest hypocrite of 2015." Lamar is at his most confrontational in "The Blacker the Berry," addressing issues such as police brutality and accepting his African heritage with lyrics about his skin color and coming from "the bottom of mankind." As he rails at racial injustice, Lamar lets rage break his usual cool composure. With an angry, guttural delivery, the pitch of voice near both screams and sobs but his words manage to come across clearly. The song's lyrics offers revolutionary slogans before Lamar turns his scope on the final verse.

Critical reception
"The Blacker the Berry" received rave reviews from music journalists. Comparing its musical content to the work of Ice Cube, Alexis Petridis of The Guardian called the number "remarkable" and credited Lamar's snarling vocal performance. He remarked, "Lamar goes right ahead and screams his head off ... powered by post-Ferguson fury, plagued by the kind of self-doubt and qualification that comes from knowing any statement you make is going to be at best picked apart and at worst torn to pieces on social media." Pitchfork deemed it their "Best New Track", with reviewer Jayson Greene claiming that the song "might be [Lamar's] most focused and upsetting performance." Steven J. Horowitz of Billboard gave the song four-and-a-half stars out of five, writing "Lamar flips to beast mode on the serrated "The Blacker the Berry," an aural manifestation of #blacklivesmatter." Kyle Anderson from Entertainment Weekly described the song as "galvanizing." AllMusic's David Jeffries cited "The Blacker" as an album highlight. Likewise, Patrick Ryan for USA Today also regards "The Blacker the Berry" as among the four best songs in addition to being a part of the album's moodier portion which "packs the bigger punch."

Controversy
The song elicited controversy following the lines, "So why did I weep when Trayvon Martin was in the street, when gang-banging make me kill a nigga blacker than me? Hypocrite!" which people perceived to be Lamar judging the black community. During an interview with MTV News, while breaking down To Pimp A Butterfly at the W New York – Downtown, Lamar spoke about the single, his Billboard interview and the criticism he's faced. Lamar stated, "A few people think it's just talk and it's just rap; no, these are my experiences. When I say, 'Gang banging made me kill a nigga blacker than me,' this is my life that I'm talking about. I'm not saying you, you might not even be from the streets. ... Know who I am first, understand where I come from before you make any remarks, because I've been through a lot and I seen a lot. Where I come from -- I did a lot to tear down my own community. So, for you to not recognize that and see 100 percent flip, please learn it."

Live performance
Lamar performed a medley of "The Blacker the Berry" and "Alright" at the 58th Grammy Awards. Following an intro from actor Don Cheadle, the rapper marched out onstage in chains with a backdrop imitating a prison for "The Blacker The Berry" before creating a bonfire for "Alright" and wrapping his set with an illuminated image of his native city Compton in the outline of Africa. In the untitled freestyle finale, Lamar references Feb. 26, the date of Trayvon Martin's death in 2012.

Track listing

Charts

Certifications

References

2015 singles
Kendrick Lamar songs
Songs written by Kendrick Lamar
Songs about black people
Songs against racism and xenophobia
Interscope Records singles
Aftermath Entertainment singles
Top Dawg Entertainment singles
2015 songs
Songs written by Boi-1da
Songs written by Stephen Kozmeniuk
Songs written by Eskeerdo
Songs about violence